Smittipora is a genus of bryozoans belonging to the family Onychocellidae.

The genus has almost cosmopolitan distribution.

Species:

Smittipora abyssicola 
Smittipora acutirostris 
Smittipora adeoniformis 
Smittipora americana 
Smittipora articularia 
Smittipora bilamellaria 
Smittipora bourgeoisi 
Smittipora calliope 
Smittipora cellarioides 
Smittipora cheethami 
Smittipora claudia 
Smittipora cordiformis 
Smittipora creona 
Smittipora dentifera 
Smittipora dimorphocella 
Smittipora elliptica 
Smittipora elongata 
Smittipora fenestrata 
Smittipora fusiformis 
Smittipora grandiconis 
Smittipora hantonensis 
Smittipora harmeriana 
Smittipora inarmata 
Smittipora irregularis 
Smittipora leognanensis 
Smittipora levigata 
Smittipora levinseni 
Smittipora lineata 
Smittipora parvulipora 
Smittipora peregrina 
Smittipora philippinensis 
Smittipora platystoma 
Smittipora plicata 
Smittipora prisca 
Smittipora ryukuensis 
Smittipora sagittaria 
Smittipora sagittellaria 
Smittipora sawayai 
Smittipora semiluna 
Smittipora tenuis 
Smittipora tuberculata 
Smittipora verticillata

References

Bryozoan genera